The J. J. Liston Trophy is awarded annually to the best and fairest senior player in the Victorian Football League (formerly the Victorian Football Association). It is named after J.J. Liston, a businessman, civic leader and sports administrator who was fundamental in advancing sport in Australia, particularly Australian Rules Football and Soccer.

History
The first award for the Association best and fairest player was the Woodham Cup, named after  committeeman Alf Woodham, which was first awarded in 1923. The Woodham Cup was renamed the Recorder Cup, named after the Association's official match-day publication, in 1926. Starting from 1933, a second award, the V.F.A. Medal (or Association Medal), was awarded concurrently. From 1933 until 1939, both the Recorder Cup and the V.F.A. Medal were presented annually based on the votes of the umpires; but the two awards were given based on different voting systems.

The two best and fairest awards were combined into one in 1940, when the Association dispensed with the Recorder Cup voting system; in 1940 and 1941, both the V.F.A. Medal and the Recorder Cup were awarded as trophies to the same player based on the same set of votes. The Association went into recess from 1942 until 1944 during World War II; upon resumption in 1945, and continuously since, the winning player has received one trophy, the J. J. Liston Trophy, named after long-term Association president John James Liston, who died in 1944.

From 1961 until 1988, when the Association operated in two divisions, the Liston Trophy was awarded to the best and fairest in Division 1. A separate award, known as the J. Field Medal, was awarded for the second division.

Voting system
The current voting system for the J. J. Liston Trophy is the same as for the Australian Football League's Brownlow Medal. At the conclusion of each game, the field umpires confer, and award three votes to the player deemed best on ground, two votes to the player deemed second-best on ground, and one vote to the player deemed third best on ground. A player is ineligible to win the award if he is suspended for a reportable offence during the season. If more than one player ties for the highest number of votes, each is awarded a Liston Trophy jointly.

Past voting systems
Initial voting rules for the Woodham and Recorder cups, used from 1924 until 1932, saw the field umpire award two votes in each game: one to the best player on each team; the player with the most votes at the end of the season won the cup. This was amended in 1933, such that the umpire awarded a single vote to the overall best player on the ground; this voting system was used from 1933 until 1939.

When the V.F.A. Medal was established in 1933, its voting system was: the field umpire and each of the two goal umpires separately awarded two votes to the player they deemed best on ground, and one vote to the player they deemed second-best on ground – a total of nine votes awarded per game, with any player able to poll a maximum of six; this voting system was retained when the Recorder Cup and V.F.A. Medals were combined in 1940, and was then used for Liston Trophy voting until 1980.

The system was altered in 1981 when a second field umpire was introduced; after this change, each field umpire awarded votes to the best two players on a 2-1 basis, but the goal umpires did not, giving a new total of six votes per game, with any player able to poll a maximum of four. This system was used only in 1981, and the present day 3-2-1 voting system, based on agreement between the two (and later, three) field umpires, was adopted in 1982.

During the 1930s, multiple players could win the V.F.A. Medal if they were tied on total number of votes. When the Liston Trophy was instituted in 1945, a countback system was introduced, such that if two players tied on votes, the award would go to the player who polled the higher number of first preferences; and (after 1981) if still tied, the higher number of second preferences; if these countbacks failed to separate the players (as occurred in 1978), the players were joint winners. The countback system was abandoned from 1988, making total votes the only criterion for the award; and, in September 1989, the Association amended the history books and awarded Liston Trophies retrospectively to players who had been beaten on a countback, following by five months a similar action taken by the Victorian Football League regarding players who had been beaten for the Brownlow Medal on countback.

Winners
J. J. Liston Trophy

† denotes the award was won retrospectively.

Recorder Cup/Woodham Cup

* Awarded under V.F.A. Medal voting rules.

V.F.A. Medal

J. Field Medal

From 1961 until 1988, the J. Field Medal was awarded to the best and fairest in the Association's second division. The award was originally known simply as the Division 2 Best and Fairest until 1968, then was named after former secretary Jack Field in 1969.

The Field Medal voting system was identical to the Liston Trophy voting in all years except 1981, when Division 1 had switched to a two-umpire system but Division 2 was still using a single umpire; in that year, the Field Trophy voting system was unchanged from 1980. As for the Liston Trophy, a countback existed until 1988 to break ties, and retrospective Field Medals were later awarded to players who had lost on this countback.

J. Field Medal

References

External links
JJ Liston Trophy Winners (Official VFL Website)

Australian rules football awards
1923 establishments in Australia
Australian rules football-related lists